Sayyid Mubarak Ali Khan II, popularly known as Humayun Jah (1810 – 1838), was born on 29 September 1810 to Ahmad Ali Khan and Nazib un-Nisa Begum. He was the Nawab of Bengal from 1824 to 1838. He was succeeded by Mansur Ali Khan. He built the famous and renowned Hazarduari Palace and Mubarak Manzil in Murshidabad, India. Nawab Nazim Humayun Jah died on 3 October 1838.

Life

Early years
Mubarak Ali Khan was the only son of Ahmad Ali Khan. He succeeded his father after he died in 1824 under the titles of Humayun Jah (Of Auspicious Rank), Shuja ul-Mulk (Hero of the Country), Ihtisham ud-Daulah (Victor in War) and Feroz-e-Jang (Dignifier of the Country).

Reign as a Nawab 
In 1826 he went to Patna for a change in the dewanship and when he attained his majority he took the management in his own hands, with the plan to dismiss Raja Ganga Dhar from the Nizamat Dewanship.

At Findall Bagh (now known as Mubarak Manzil) the Courts of Justice of the East India Company was erected, however, it was unused after the administration of law and justice was removed to Calcutta. The Sadar Dewani Adalat (courts or darbars) were held here from 1765 to 1781 until it was removed to Calcutta. Subsequently, the Civil and Criminal Courts (which were located here) was transferred by Lord Cornwallis in 1793 by transferring the Supreme court to Calcutta. This spacious property of Findall Bagh was abandoned. There were also three buildings on this spacious property.

In May 1830 Nawab Humayun Jah bought this property from Raja Kissen Chand Bahadur and Kumar Chand of Nashipur for an amount of  35,000. He transformed the property into a pleasure garden and erected the Moti Mahal (also known as the Red Bunglow) here, he named the garden Mubarak Manzil.

On the terrace in front of Moti Mahal stood the Royal Throne (black throne) used by the Nawab "Nazims" of Bengal from the time of Shah Shuja. It was brought here by Nawab Nazim Humayun Jah. This Royal Throne is round in shape and is made up of black stone. The throne is 6 feet (72 inches) in diameter and 1.5 feet (18 inches) high. It was made at Mongyer, Bihar by Khwaja Nazar of Bokhara in 1643 AD. Robert Clive placed Mir Jafar on this throne at Mansurganj after the Battle of Plassey in 1757 AD. Clive to sat on it side-by-side with Najimuddin Ali Khan at Motijhil when celebrating the pooneath after the acquisition of the Dewani by the East India Company. The throne is now kept in Victoria Museum, Kolkata.

Death and succession 

Nawab Nazim Humayun Jah died on 3 October 1838 and was succeeded by his son, Mansur Ali Khan.

See also
List of rulers of Bengal
Nawabs of Bengal
History of Bengal
History of Bangladesh
History of India

References

External links
 

Nawabs of Bengal
1810 births
1838 deaths